Kisha Ford (born April 4, 1975) is a former WNBA player for the New York Liberty, Orlando Miracle, and the Miami Sol. She attended Bryn Mawr School and played college basketball at Georgia Tech, where she was the all-time leading scorer in team history. She competed with USA Basketball as a member of the 1995 Jones Cup Team that won the Bronze in Taipei. She was selected in the fourth round of the 1997 WNBA Draft at 27th overall by the New York Liberty. Over her WNBA career, she scored 442 points, grabbed 218 rebounds, and had 90 assists, and 111 steals.

WNBA career
1997–1998: New York Liberty
1999: Orlando Miracle
2000–2001: Miami Sol

Notes

External links
WNBA profile

1975 births
Living people
American women's basketball players
American expatriate basketball people in Sweden
Georgia Tech Yellow Jackets women's basketball players
Miami Sol players
New York Liberty draft picks
New York Liberty players
Orlando Miracle players
Basketball players from Baltimore